Obot-Akara is in the south of Nigeria and is a Local Government Area of Akwa Ibom State.

It is inhabited by the Anaangs ethnic group. It shares borders with Ikwuano(Abia State).

Food in Obot Akara 

Obot Akara like every Akwa Ibomites delight in Udia (Yam) with Ukang (sauce). They eat Ukwogho Etidot (Efik Bitter leaf soup), Otong Soup, Iwuk Edesi (Native jollof rice); Iwuk Ukom (plantain pottage), Edesi isip (efik coconut rice), Edika Ikong soup. Others like Efere Etighi, Egbank nkukwo, Afang soup, Afia Efere (white soup), Atama soup. These people have many delicacy that one can actually eat during vacation.

Language in Obot Akara

Obot Akara falls among the Annang tribe in Akwa Ibom State, so they speak Annang, Efik and Ibibio is a possible heard or spoken among those who have moved from one part of the city or state to another. English is an Official Language in Nigeria so it taught in schools for better understanding, there is a Subtitle English called Pidgin, this language is spoken among those who do not have formal Education. Hausa, Yoruba, and Igbo languages are spoken by some Indigene and most Migrants.

Religion in Obot Akara town

The people of Obot Akara are well known for their Tradition and Cultural festival. Obot Akara engage in Folklores games, Masquerades, Dances like Abiokpo, Asian Uboikpa, Ekpo, Uta, etc. Although civilization from Christianity has made many; to turn away from their old ways and believe in God.

Population in Obot Akara town
It is one of the 31 local government areas in Akwa Ibom state. And has its headquarters at Nto Edino. The town has three major districts. Which are Obot Akara, Nto Edino and Ikot Abia. The town has 28 Autonomous communities. Nto Edino has 28 as well while Ikot Abia has 22 communities. According to 2006 population from a source the town was 147,286. Although, it rise during the 2011 population project to 174,580. However, there is a tendency that it population is greater than 174,580 presently.

Social Amenities and Infrastructure in Obot Akara
The town has several primary and secondary schools. That are Government and private schools. There is also Palm Oil depot. 29 Adult Education Centers constructed. Ultra-Modern Executive Chambers at Nto Edino. There is Obot Akara Unity Hall. They have Model FIDA Community Civic Center. 200 ft constructed borehole, 20,000 liters tank on a steel tower of 40 ft. There is Mbiaso/Ikot Ukpong bridge linking the communities together. There is also a world class Chambers for Traditional Rulers Council; constructed in the town.

The town has also hosted the 9th and 10th season of Guilder Ultimate Search (GUS) in Usaka forest. The season 9 which was titled “The Gatekeeper’s Fortune” was won by Pascal Eronmose. And the Season 10 titled “The Tenth Symbol” was won by Denis Okike.

There are four airports close to Obot-Akara and these are Sam Mbakwe International Airport, Margaret Ekpo International Airport, Port Harcourt International Airport, and Asaba International Airport.

References

Local Government Areas in Akwa Ibom State